YMFC may refer to:
 Yorkshire Main F.C.
 23S rRNA pseudouridine2457 synthase, an enzyme
Young Ministers For Christ